Totally Saturday is an entertainment and audience participation programme aired by the BBC in the United Kingdom. It premiered on BBC One on 6 June 2009 and ran for seven weeks.

Production 
The seven-part series, produced by BBC Vision, Unlike Noel's House Party the show been broadcast for 7 weeks and was commissioned by BBC One Controller Jay Hunt and Controller of Entertainment Commissioning Mark Linsey. A pilot for the show was created months beforehand.

Content 
The show turns the tables on members of the audience, by assuming control of their possessions, and putting them centre stage along with celebrities. During the live show, viewers could join in from their homes. One game was called the "Hamster Run", which viewers played with Norton via telephone. Participants had the chance to win a holiday.

Cancellation 
On 6 July 2009, it was announced that the BBC have decided to axe the show after just one series, due to poor ratings.

Episodes

References

External links 
 
 
 

2009 British television series debuts
2009 British television series endings
BBC Television shows
BBC television game shows
English-language television shows